Argentum Online is a 1999 Argentinian MMORPG video game. It is available on Microsoft Windows and developed by Pablo Márquez in the city of La Plata. 

It has the distinction of being the first MMORPG developed in Argentina. A sequel entitled Argentum 2 was at one point in development. 

The game has had a life outside of the fictional universe, one of the title's gamemasters noted "The fact that the Argentum community has transcended the barrier of pure fiction is for most of the players one of the most positive characteristics of the game. One day the idea of having dinner arose, to meet us all."

The developers and fans worked together to create variants and mods of the game, by 2001 four different versions had been made.

The game's source code was released in 2003 under the GNU GPL license and can be downloaded from SourceForge. This has caused many player-run servers to be created. These servers aren't moderated nor controlled by the original developers and are normally mechanically different from the 2003 version of the game.

Source code in GitHub: https://github.com/ao-libre/

In 2020 Pablo Marquez and a team of other developers started developing a sequel called Argentum Forever. However, development was soon abandoned and donations made in support of the game were not returned.

La Nación described it as a "local pioneer" of the RPG genre. Página 12 suggested that the game is an "anarchic" game with no owner and instead a "game of the people".

References 

1999 video games
Video games developed in Argentina
Massively multiplayer online role-playing games
Windows games
Windows-only games